Plainfield High School is located in Central Village, Connecticut.

Notable alumni

 Walt Dropo, former MLB player (Boston Red Sox, Detroit Tigers, Chicago White Sox, Cincinnati Reds, Baltimore Orioles)

References

External links
 

Public high schools in Connecticut
Schools in Windham County, Connecticut
Plainfield, Connecticut